Thanasis Kolitsidakis (born 21 November 1966) is a Greek former football defender and later manager.

Career
Kolitsidakis played most of his career for Apollon Smyrnis, Panathinaikos FC and OFI Crete.

He made 14 appearances for the Greece national football team, and was a participant at the 1994 FIFA World Cup.

References

External links

1966 births
Living people
Greek footballers
Greece international footballers
Super League Greece players
Panathinaikos F.C. players
Apollon Smyrnis F.C. players
OFI Crete F.C. players
1994 FIFA World Cup players
Association football defenders
Footballers from Thessaloniki
Greek football managers
Kalamata F.C. managers
Irodotos FC managers